Impressions de France (Impressions of France) is a film about France and the featured attraction in the France Pavilion of Epcot's World Showcase at Walt Disney World in Florida. The movie is presented in the Palais du Cinéma building and projected onto five adjacent screens, giving 200° coverage and resembling a Cinerama Screen, in which one giant, curved screen stretches so wide that the edges are at the peripheral vision of the average person, unlike Circle-Vision 360° found at the Canada pavilion and the China pavilion.

Synopsis
Impressions de France is one of the original Epcot park attractions which has been playing every day since the park opened in 1982. It is also recognized by the Guinness World Records as holding the world record for the "longest running daily screening of a film in the same theater." The film sweeps pavilion guests into a tour of the French countryside, major cities, various regions and important structures. Set to a musical score written and arranged by Buddy Baker (composer), the film encompasses the music of classical French composers such as Claude Debussy and Camille Saint-Saëns.  The film is the work of director Rick Harper  and written and co-produced by two-time Academy Award nominee Bob Rogers. The film's aerial views, mixed with closer views, include, the Eiffel Tower, the Champs-Élysées and the Arc de Triomphe, the French Alps, Versailles, scenes from Cannes, Notre Dame de Paris and scenes from Normandy. The movie is presented with a lively classical soundtrack and narrated by Claude Gobet.

Scene list
The film showcases 49 locations in France. The areas that appear (in order) in Impressions de France are:

 The cliffs at Étretat in Normandy
 Gliding through the Marais Poitevin, a swamp area near La Rochelle
 Château de Chenonceau; in the Loire Valley, then from the gardens
 Horsemen and hunting dogs cross the Cheverny Forest
 Aerial shot of Château de Chambord
 Flying over the red rooftops up to the bell tower of the church in the Vézelay village
 Vezelay Church interior, with church bells in the background
 Horsecart ride through Riquewihr Village near Germany
 Moving through the market place in Beuvron-en-Auge, Normandy
 French pastries
 Wine harvest at the Monbazillac Vineyard
 Interior of a Cognac cave
 The Fountain of Apollo at Versailles
 The Palace of Versailles Garden
 The Versailles building and the Hall of Mirrors
 Flying over Castle Beynac in the Dordogne Valley
 Man chopping wood with Chateau Montpoupon
 La Roque - Gageac in the Dordogne Valley (bicyclists)
 Chateau Montpoupon, bicyclists racing toward us
 Bugatti race cars in Cannes
 Hot air balloons take off near Chaumont Castle on the Loire river
 Hot air balloons in front of the cliff city of Rocamadour
 French Alps in the spring
 Mountain climbers on rocky peaks in Chamonix (French Alps)
 Skiers in Chamonix
 La Rochelle Harbor
 On board a Brittany fishing boat at sea
 Fishing boats on the rocky beach of Etretat in Normandy
 Mont Saint-Michel
 Interior of Notre-Dame-de-Penhors church in Pouldreuzic, Brittany
 Wedding reception in full swing at a Brittany farm to traditional Brittany folk music
 Couple walks along the cliffs of Normandy in Étretat
 The cliff city of Bonifacio, Corsica
 Villefranche near Nice
 Calanque cliffs near Cassis
 Pier in front of the Carlton Hotel in Cannes
 Cannes Harbor at twilight
 Racing along railway tracks in the small Lozère town of Chapeauroux next to the Allier River
 Gare du Nord (North rail station) in Paris
 Champs-Élysées at twilight featuring the Arc de Triomphe
 Seine River in Paris
 Notre Dame de Paris
 Through the archways at the Louvre, the Republican Guard
 Eiffel Tower
 Aerial shot of Étretat Cliffs
 Aerial shot of the Pyrenées of Cirque de Gavarnie
 Aerial shot of Château de Chambord
 Aerial shot of French Alps near Mont Blanc
 Finale - Eiffel Tower

Soundtrack
Buddy Baker arranged the film score, and he conducted the Royal Philharmonic Orchestra at Abbey Road Studios. The soundtrack was recorded digitally with a Sony prototype recorder, and Impressions de France became the first movie with a digital soundtrack from beginning to end.

Rick Harper made the initial selections of French music for the movie. Regarding the inspiration for his musical choices, Harper said:

I grew up being exposed to a lot of great music. My mother is a fantastic musician and pianist, and when I was in grade school, she would take me out of school to go the San Francisco opera and symphony. I built a classical music collection of records starting from when I was about 6 years old. I was really familiar with music from the Romantic era and primarily French music.  It's almost in my DNA. Even to this day, that's the music of my preference.

A listing of the movie's score from official and unofficial sources:

The selections marked with * can be found on these albums:
Walt Disney World Resort: The Official Album (1999)
Walt Disney World Resort: Official Album (2000)
Official Album: Walt Disney World Resort Celebrating 100 Years of Magic (2001)
Official Album: The Happiest Celebration on Earth – Walt Disney World Resort Album
Official Album: Where Magic Lives – Walt Disney World Resort
Four Parks - One World: Walt Disney World Official Album (2008)

Additions 
On January 17, 2020, the Palais du Cinéma theatre began its new schedule, which involves alternating between showing Impressions de France and a Beauty and the Beast sing-along.

References

External links

 Walt Disney World Resort - Impressions de France

Amusement rides introduced in 1982
Walt Disney Parks and Resorts attractions
Epcot
1982 films
Walt Disney Parks and Resorts films
French documentary films
World Showcase
Films scored by Buddy Baker (composer)
Multi-screen film
1982 establishments in Florida
1980s French films